The Dart River, a perennial river of the North-East Murray catchment of the Murray-Darling basin, is located in the Alpine region of Victoria, Australia. It flows from the northwestern slopes of the Alpine National Park in the Australian Alps, south and joins with the Mitta Mitta River within Lake Dartmouth.

Course
The river rises in remote state forestry land within the Wabba Wilderness Park, below the Great Dividing Range. The river flows generally south by southwest, joined by six minor tributaries before reaching its confluence with the Mitta Mitta River at Lake Dartmouth, formed by the Dartmouth Dam. The river descends  over its  course.

Recreation

An area of approximately  located adjacent to where the Dart River empties into Lake Dartmouth, named the Dart River Goldfields Area, is listed as an indicative area on the Register of the National Estate. The area is considered historically significant due to its relatively undisturbed setting of the history of gold mining, with many machinery relics from the 1870s.

See also

References

External links

North-East catchment
Rivers of Hume (region)
Alpine National Park